The history of Twitter can be traced back to a brainstorming session at Odeo.

Major events

Full timeline

See also 
 History of Facebook
 History of YouTube
 Timeline of Snapchat
 Timeline of Pinterest
 Timeline of LinkedIn
 Timeline of social media

References

Twitter
Twitter
Twitter
Twitter